Fuzzy Warbles Volume 2 is the second volume in the Fuzzy Warbles series, released in December 2002. The Fuzzy Warbles Series brings together demos, rarities and side projects from XTC founding member Andy Partridge.

Track listing
All songs written by Andy Partridge.

 "Ridgeway Path" – 0:57
 "I Don't Want to Be Here (AIDS Benefit Version)" – 4:02
 "Young Marrieds" – 3:23
 "No One Here Available" – 0:18
 "Obscene Procession" – 4:13
 "Miller Time" – 1:10
 "You're the Wish You Are I Had" – 3:21
 "Ra Ra Rehearsal" – 2:15
 "Ra Ra For Red Rocking Horse" – 3:43
 "Everything'll Be Alright" – 3:02
 "25 O'Clock" – 2:22
 "GOOM" – 1:59
 "Chain of Command" – 2:41
 "All of a Sudden (It's Too Late)" – 1:10
 "Summer's Cauldron" – 5:33
 "Then She Appeared" – 2:59
 "It's Snowing Angels" – 3:18
 "Ship Trapped in the Ice" – 3:11

Personnel
Andy Partridge – instruments and vocals on all tracks
Colin Moulding – bass on 2, 13, 15 and vocal on 2
Dave Gregory – piano on 8, guitar on 13 and 15, synth and drum programming on 15, recording engineer on 8, 15
Terry Chambers – drums on 13
Steve Warren and 'Bubble' – recording engineers on 13

Credits
All songs were recorded at Andy's home except 8, 15 at Dave's home and 13 at Redbrick Studio, Swindon Town Hall.
Mastered by Ian Cooper at Metropolis Mastering, London
Sleeve art by Andrew Swainson
Thank you thank you Steve Young for all the juggling. God and the Devil for refusing to exist, despite mankind's best efforts, and Erica for teaching me Fifi.
Big thanks to Virgin Records for making this series possible and to Dave Gregory for cleaning and supplying master tapes for 8 and 15.

Andy Partridge albums
Demo albums
2002 compilation albums